The Grey Dance is a painting by Väinö Kunnas, from 1928.

Description
The painting has dimensions 63.5 x 57 centimeters.
It is in the collection of the Ateneum, Helsinki.

Analysis
The painting is a still life with two dummies with articulated joints posed as dancing.

References

Finnish paintings
Dance in art
Paintings in the collection of the Ateneum
1928 paintings